The 1996–97 Meistriliiga was the sixth season of the Meistriliiga, Estonia's premier football league. Lantana won their second title.

Preliminary round

League table

Results

Championship Tournament
The points obtained during the preliminary round were carried over halved and rounded up.

League table

Results

Meistriliiga Transition Tournament
Eesti Põlevkivi Jõhvi and PVall, the teams finishing in the last two positions in the preliminary round, faced four best teams of the 1996-97 Esiliiga in the play-off for two places in the 1997-98 Meistriliiga.

Top scorers

See also
 1996 in Estonian football
 1997 in Estonian football

Notes

References
 Estonia - List of final tables (RSSSF)

Meistriliiga seasons
1996 in Estonian football
1997 in Estonian football
Estonia